Bateman Park is a soccer stadium located in Abbotsford, British Columbia. It is the home venue for the University of the Fraser Valley soccer teams and the Fraser Valley Mariners.

References

Buildings and structures in Abbotsford, British Columbia
Soccer venues in Canada